Route 74 is a highway in Cape Girardeau County, Missouri.  The western terminus is at Route 25 in Dutchtown.  Its eastern terminus is at the Illinois state line at the Mississippi River at Cape Girardeau.  The road continues into Illinois as Illinois Route 146.  No other towns are on the route.

Route 74 is one of the original state highways.  It has remained unchanged since it was created in 1922.

Major intersections

References

074
Transportation in Cape Girardeau County, Missouri